John Waldemar Wydler (June 9, 1924 – August 4, 1987) was a Republican member of the United States House of Representatives from New York.

Wydler was born in Brooklyn. He served in the United States Army Air Corps from 1942 until 1945. He graduated from Brown University in 1947 and Harvard University Law School in 1950. He served in the United States attorney's office for the Eastern District of New York from 1953 until 1959. He was elected to Congress in 1962 and served from January 3, 1963, until January 3, 1981. He was a delegate to the 1968 Republican National Convention.

On December 24, 1987, the U.S. Post Office at Garden City, New York was named in his honor.  In addition, the John W. Wydler Government Documents Depository, Axinn Library, at Hofstra University, was also dedicated to him. Wydler is buried in the Cemetery of the Holy Rood in Westbury, New York.

References

Sources

External links

1924 births
1987 deaths
Burials at the Cemetery of the Holy Rood
Harvard Law School alumni
Brown University alumni
United States Army Air Forces soldiers
United States Army personnel of World War II
People from Brooklyn
Republican Party members of the United States House of Representatives from New York (state)
20th-century American politicians